is a railway station located in Sakyō-ku, Kyoto, Kyoto Prefecture, Japan.

The name "Demachiyanagi" is the combined name of "Demachi" in Kawaramachi Imadegawa, the west side of Kamo River, and "Yanagi" around the station, the east side of that.

Lines
Eizan Electric Railway (Eiden)
Eizan Main Line (station number: E01)
Keihan Electric Railway
Ōtō Line

Layout
The station is separated into two sections: the ground-level Eiden station and the underground Keihan station. Tracks of the two lines are not connected.

Eizan Railway

There are 4 dead-end platforms with 3 tracks on the ground with bus station and the entrance of Keihan Railway, along Kawabata Dori.

Keihan Railway

The station owned by Keihan Railway is located under Kawabata Dori.  There is an island platform with 2 tracks under the ticket gates. There are ticket gates in the north and the south. The north one is called "Eiden Gate" and the south one is "Imadegawa Gate".

Eizan Railway and the north side of Imadegawa Dori is connected with the Eiden Gate, and the south side of Imadegawa Dori is with the Imadegawa Gate

Limited express trains usually depart from Track (Platform) 2.

Surroundings
East side of Kamo River and Takano River
Yoshida Shrine
Hyakuman-ben Chion-ji
Kyoto University Yoshida Campus
Kyoto Computer Gakuin
The Kyoto College of Graduate Studies for Informatics
Sakyo-ku General Building, Ktoyo
West side of Kamo River and Takano River
Kamo Mioya Shrine (Shimogamo Shrine)
Doshisha University Imadegawa Campus
Doshisha Women's College of Liberal Arts Imadegawa Campus
Kyoto Imperial Palace

Adjacent stations

References

External links
 Station map by Keihan Railway

Railway stations in Japan opened in 1925
Railway stations in Japan opened in 1989
Railway stations in Kyoto Prefecture